Walter O'Neale, D.D. was an Irish Anglican priest.

O'Neale was educated at Trinity College, Dublin. He was Archdeacon of Ardfert from 1676 to 1686; Treasurer of Cork from 1681 to 1686; Prebendary of Templebryan in Ross Cathedral from 1682 to 1684; Chancellor of Ross from 1683 to 1706; Precentor of Cork from 1686 to 1706; and a Prebendary of Kilmaclenine in Cloyne Cathedral from 1706.

References

17th-century Irish Anglican priests
Archdeacons of Ardfert
Diocese of Limerick, Ardfert and Aghadoe
Diocese of Cork, Cloyne and Ross
Alumni of Trinity College Dublin
18th-century Irish Anglican priests